The 2011–12 Maltese FA Trophy was the 74th season since its establishment. In a change from last season, this year's competition will include all teams from Malta and Gozo. The competition began on 8 September 2011 and will ended 27 May 2012 with the Final in Ta' Qali Stadium. The defending champions are Floriana, having won their 19th Maltese Cup last season and first since 1994.  The winner will qualify to the first qualifying round of the 2012–13 UEFA Europa League.

Floriana were the defending champions, but were eliminated in the quarter-finals by Hibernians.

Calendar
Matches began on 8 September 2011 and concluded with the final on 27 May 2012.

First round
Entering this round were 12 clubs from the Maltese Third Division, 6 clubs from the Gozo Football League First Division and 4 clubs from the Gozo Football League Second Division. These matches took place between 8 and 11 September 2011.

|colspan="3" style="background:#fcc;"|8 September 2011

|-
|colspan="3" style="background:#fcc;"|10 September 2011

|-
|colspan="3" style="background:#fcc;"|11 September 2011

|}

Second round
Entering this round were the 11 winners from the First Round along with the 12 Maltese First Division clubs, the 14 Maltese Second Division clubs, 2 clubs from the Maltese Third Division and 1 club from the Gozo Football League First Division. These matches took place between 12 and 20 November 2011.

|colspan="3" style="background:#fcc;"|12 November 2011

|-
|colspan="3" style="background:#fcc;"|13 November 2011

|-
|colspan="3" style="background:#fcc;"|19 November 2011

|-
|colspan="3" style="background:#fcc;"|20 November 2011

|}

Third round
Entering this round were the 20 winners from the Second Round and the 12 clubs from the Maltese Premier League. These matches took place between 16 and 18 December 2011.

|colspan="3" style="background:#fcc;"|16 December 2011

|-
|colspan="3" style="background:#fcc;"|17 December 2011

|-
|colspan="3" style="background:#fcc;"|18 December 2011

|}

Fourth round
Entering this round were the 16 winners from the Third Round. These matches took place between 21 and 22 January 2012.

|colspan="3" style="background:#fcc;"|21 January 2012

|-
|colspan="3" style="background:#fcc;"|22 January 2012

|}

Quarter-finals
Entering this round were the eight winners from the Fourth Round.

Semi-finals
Entering this round were the four winners from the Quarterfinals.

Final
Entering this round were the two winners from the Semifinals.

References

External links
 Official site

Maltese Cup
Cup
Maltese FA Trophy seasons